David Abbott may refer to:

Tank Abbott (born 1965), real name David Abbott, American heavyweight mixed martial artist
David Abbott (magician) (1863–1934), American magician and author of Behind the Scenes with the Mediums
David Abbott (athlete) (1902–1987), American Olympic athlete
David Abbott (cricket umpire) (1934–2016), British-born New Zealand cricket umpire
David Abbott (advertising) (1938–2014), British advertising executive and founder of Abbott Mead Vickers BBDO
David Abbott (Indiana politician), member of the Indiana House of Representatives